Wang Liang (Chinese:王亮; Pinyin: Wáng Liàng) is a Chinese professional footballer who currently plays as a full-back or winger for Dalian Duxing.

Club career
Wang Liang started his career with Dalian Shide F.C. and was loaned out to their youth team called Dalian Shide Siwu FC who were allowed to take part in Singapore's 2008 S.League. Upon his return to Dalian Shide at the beginning of the 2009 Chinese Super League Wang Liang would make his debut for the team in the club's first game of the season as a late substitute on March 22, 2009, in a 4–1 defeat to Tianjin Teda. After the game he would then become a squad player for the next several seasons until half-way through the 2012 Chinese league season he would go on loan third-tier club Beijing Yitong Kuche until the end of the season.

On 28 February 2018, Wang transferred to Chinese Super League side Dalian Yifang.
After lost one match in Dalian Yifang, Wang was found in Dalian famous bath center "高深会馆", and leave really bad influence to fans and club. People gave him a nickname: “澡亮”. Next day, Wang was put on the bench and never get opportunity to play until the end of the season.
On 28 February 2019, Wang was loaned to League Two side Dalian Chanjoy for the 2019 season.

Career statistics 
Statistics accurate as of match played 31 December 2022.

References

External links
Player profile at Sodasoccer.com 

1989 births
Living people
Chinese footballers
Footballers from Dalian
Dalian Shide F.C. players
Liaoning F.C. players
Dalian Professional F.C. players
Chinese Super League players
Association football midfielders